Jericho, Wisconsin may refer to the following places in the U.S. state of Wisconsin:
Jericho, Calumet County, Wisconsin, an unincorporated community
Jericho, Waukesha County, Wisconsin, an unincorporated community